is a Japanese documentary from 1964 directed by Noriaki Tsuchimoto.

Film content
The film focuses on the taxi drivers of Tokyo in the year before the Tokyo Olympics and the difficulties they face: construction obstructing traffic, poor working conditions, numerous accidents, and bad pay. It becomes a critique of a changing and modernizing urban Japan.

Production
The film was originally commissioned by the Tokyo Metropolitan Police Department and the National Police Agency as a traffic safety documentary. Tsuchimoto's proposal had won the competition for the project, but he ended up changing the film after cooperating with a cab driver's union which was protesting work conditions. The film was partially scripted and amateur actors played the main roles. The resulting film offended the TMPD, which refused to use it.

Reception
The film won several foreign and domestic awards in 1964. The film critic Chris Fujiwara, commenting about the DVD, called On the Road: A Document  "a breakthrough film . . . Constantly imaginative and vigorous in depicting movement but never fetishising it in a facile or celebratory way, On the Road has the working-class speed and grimness of an early-1930s Warner Bros film, at the same time reshaping stray observational surprises in the manner of Beat poetry."

References

External links 
 

Japanese documentary films
1964 documentary films
1960s Japanese-language films
Films directed by Noriaki Tsuchimoto
Documentary films about cities
Transport in Tokyo
Documentary films about road transport
1960s Japanese films